Cyrus Sears (March 10, 1832 – November 30, 1909) was an American soldier who fought in the American Civil War. Sears received his country's highest award for bravery during combat, the Medal of Honor. Sear's medal was awarded for his heroism during the Battle of Iuka in Mississippi on 19 September 1862. He was honored with the award on December 31, 1892.

Sears was born in Meredith, New York, and entered service in Bucyrus, Ohio. He was buried in Upper Sandusky, Ohio.

Medal of Honor citation

See also
List of American Civil War Medal of Honor recipients: Q–S

References

1832 births
1909 deaths
American Civil War recipients of the Medal of Honor
People from Washington County, Ohio
People of New York (state) in the American Civil War
People of Ohio in the American Civil War
Union Army officers
United States Army Medal of Honor recipients
People from Delaware County, New York